Stigmella kaimanua is a moth of the family Nepticulidae which is endemic to New Zealand.

Adults have been recorded in November and December. There is one generation per year.

The larvae feed on Parsonsia heterophylla. They mine the leaves of their host plant. The mine is linear and situated in either the upper or lower mesophyll layer of the leaf tissue, often near the midrib. The gallery continues down the stem for a short distance. Larva have been recorded from April to August. They are 3–4 mm long and whitish yellow.

The cocoon is probably attached to detritus on the ground.

References

External links

Nepticulidae
Moths described in 1989
Endemic fauna of New Zealand
Moths of New Zealand
Endemic moths of New Zealand